Australian cricketer Sir Don Bradman,often recognized as the greatest batsman of all time, scored twenty-nine Test cricket centuries during his international career which lasted from 1928 to 1948. However, his cricketing career was interrupted from 1940 to 1946 due to the outbreak of World War II, followed by poor health. He assumed captaincy of the Australian side in 1946, and scored fourteen of his centuries as captain. Bradman holds the world record for the most double centuries scored by a single batsman, with twelve to his name. He was the first of four batsmen to have twice scored triple centuries, Brian Lara, Virender Sehwag and Chris Gayle. His total of nineteen centuries against England remains the world record for the highest number of centuries against a single team.

When he made 334—his first triple century—against England in the 1930 Ashes, Bradman scored 309 of those runs on 11 July 1930, which remains as the highest number of runs scored by a single batsman in one day. It was the highest individual Test score until Wally Hammond scored 336 in 1933. Len Hutton then surpassed Wally Hammond with 364 in 1938 which stood until 1958 when Garfield Sobers scored 365 not out. Later Brian Lara scored 400 in 2004. In the same series, Bradman went on to score a further century and two more double centuries, accumulating 974 runs in 7 innings—the most runs scored by one batsman in a single series. In 1937, Bradman, suffering from influenza and coming in at the seventh position, scored 270 to guide his team to victory against England. It was rated as the best Test innings of all time by the Wisden Cricketers' Almanack in 2001. It is also the highest score made by a number 7 batsman, while his 304 against England in 1934 was the highest score made by a number 5 batsman, until January 2012, when Michael Clarke made 329* against the touring Indians.

By the time of his retirement in 1948, Bradman had made twenty-nine centuries in eighty innings. These centuries, with which he had accumulated 5,393 of his 6,996 Test runs, were scored with a 36.25% ratio of centuries per innings played. This allowed him to maintain a career batting average of 99.94, while no other batsman has been able to reach 62. He would have retired with an average of 100 had he scored four more runs in his final innings.

Key

Test cricket centuries

Notes

References

External links
Player profile of Bradman at Cricinfo

Don Bradman
Bradman
Bradman, Don